Siga Fatima Jagne is a Gambian feminist scholar and administrator. She is the Commissioner for Social Affairs and Gender at ECOWAS.

Life
Siga Fatima Jagne has a MA from Cornell University in 1989, and gained her PhD in 1994 from the State University of New York at Binghamton, with a thesis on the writers Mariama Bâ and Bessie Head.

As ECOWAS Commissioner for Social Affairs and Gender, in November 2019 she helped launch 50 Million African Women Speak (50MAWS), a digital platform to help women in Africa access information to help them grow their businesses. In June 2020, speaking on World Refugee Day in Abuja, Jagne promised that ECOWAS would support member states to help those affected by the worsening humanitarian crisis in the Sahel.

Works
 (ed. with Pushpa Naidu Parekh) Postcolonial African writers: a bio-bibliographical critical sourcebook. Westport, Conn: Greenwood Press, 1998.
 (ed.) Nation-states and the challenges of regional integration in West Africa. The case of the Gambia. Paris: Éd. Karthala, 2010

References

Year of birth missing (living people)
Living people
Cornell University alumni
Binghamton University alumni
Economic Community of West African States
Gambian feminists